Kwasi Sainti Baffoe-Bonnie (1950 – 1 February 2021) was a Ghanaian media administrator and politician. He was the founder and CEO of Network Broadcasting Company Limited which served as a mother company for Radio Gold.

Early life and education 
Baffoe-Bonnie was born in 1950 in the Western North region of Ghana. He studied at University of Cape Coast where he graduated with a Bachelor of Arts degree (Hons) Ed in History in 1978/79. In 1980/81, he further had his Master of Arts degree in International Affairs from Ohio University in New York in USA.

Career 
Baffoe-Bonnie established the Network Broadcasting Company Limited which runs Radio Gold, TV Gold and Montie FM where he was the CEO from 1995 to 2008. He was the board chairman of Ghana Air Catering Services from 2006 to 2007.

Politics 
Baffoe-Bonnie was a member of the National Democratic Congress. He served as a Senior Political Advisor to the then Vice President of the Republic of Ghana; John Dramani Mahama, from 2009 to 2012. From 2012 to 2016, Baffoe-Bonnie also served as a Presidential Staffer and Senior Advisor on Political Affairs to John Dramani Mahama when he was the President of the Republic of Ghana.

Personal life 
He was married with three children namely Ama Aniwaa Baffoe-Bonnie, Kweku Agyeman Baffoe-Bonnie, and Kwaku Amoa Baffoe-Bonnie. He was the brother of Supreme Court Judge, Paul Baffoe-Bonnie.

Death 
He died on 1 February 2021 in Accra. According to some reports, the cause of his death was unknown. but other reports also claimed he died after battling a short illness. however other reports claimed he died after contracting COVID-19.

References 

National Democratic Congress (Ghana) politicians
2021 deaths
Ghanaian mass media people
1950 births
Ohio University alumni
University of Cape Coast alumni
People from Western Region (Ghana)
Ghanaian presidential advisors